Pamela J. Lincoln is a retired United States Air Force major general who had served as the mobilization assistant to the commander of the United States Space Command. Prior to that, she was the mobilization assistant to the Chief of Staff of the United States Air Force.

References

Living people
Year of birth missing (living people)
Place of birth missing (living people)
United States Air Force generals
Major generals